Black terrapin may refer to:

 Seychelles black terrapin (Pelusios seychellensis), a recently extinct pelomedusid turtle that was once endemic to Seychelles.
 Black river turtle (Rhinoclemmys funerea), a geoemydid turtle found in Central America.
 Black marsh turtle (Siebenrockiella crassicollis), a geoemydid turtle found in Southeast Asia.

See also
 Pelusios
 Black mud turtle (disambiguation)
 

Animal common name disambiguation pages